Astragalus pseudiodanthus is a species of milkvetch known by the common name Tonopah milkvetch. It is native to the Great Basin deserts of Nevada and eastern California, such as the Tonopah area, where it grows in sandy habitat.

This plant is named for the very similar Astragalus iodanthus, of which it is sometimes treated as a variety.

Description
This is a small mat-forming perennial herb extending several stems from a stem base which lies beneath the surface of the sand. The leaves are up to 5 centimeters long and are made up of small crowded leaflets. The inflorescence is a cluster of reddish purple flowers.

The fruit is a legume pod up to about 2.5 centimeters long. It is fleshy when new and dries to a leathery texture.

External links
Jepson Manual Treatment
USDA Plants Profile
Nevada Natural Heritage Rare Plants Profile

pseudiodanthus
Flora of Nevada
Flora of the Great Basin
Flora of the California desert regions
Natural history of Nye County, Nevada
Flora without expected TNC conservation status